Peter Edwards Carmichael Sr. (March 4, 1941 – January 22, 2016) was an American football coach who has more than 40 years of coaching experience at the high school, collegiate, and professional levels. He served as the head football coach at Trenton State College in 1973, and the United States Merchant Marine Academy from 1977 to 1980.

Born in Plainfield, New Jersey, Carmichael was raised in North Plainfield and played both baseball and football at North Plainfield High School.

In 1995, Carmichael was on the inaugural coaching staff for the Jacksonville Jaguars, where he served as wide receivers coach.

Carmichael died on January 22, 2016. His son, Pete Carmichael Jr., is the current offensive coordinator for the New Orleans Saints.

Head coaching record

Football

References

1941 births
2016 deaths
American football quarterbacks
Boston College Eagles football coaches
Chicago Bears coaches
Cleveland Browns coaches
Columbia Lions football coaches
Holy Cross Crusaders football coaches
High school football coaches in New Jersey
Jacksonville Jaguars coaches
Louisiana Tech Bulldogs football coaches
Merchant Marine Mariners football coaches
Montclair State Red Hawks football players
National Football League offensive coordinators
New Hampshire Wildcats football coaches
Pittsburgh Panthers football coaches
TCNJ Lions baseball coaches
TCNJ Lions football coaches
VMI Keydets football coaches
North Plainfield High School alumni
People from North Plainfield, New Jersey
Sportspeople from Plainfield, New Jersey
Players of American football from New Jersey